Dasein (Transl. Determinate being)  is a 2015 Indian Bengali language drama film written and directed by Shailik Bhaumik. The film is produced under the banner of HLC Studios. The film starring Sumanta Mukherjee, Manisha Chakravorty, Anu Chatterjee and Ipshita Samanta are in main cast.
This movie examines the causes of human despondency and desire as well as the contradiction of being in constant interaction with other people but ultimately remaining alone within oneself.

Cast
Sumanta Mukherjee as Aniket
Manisha Chakravorty as Hrittika
Anu Chatterjee as Anu
Ipshita Samanta as Ipshita

Synopsis
‘Dasein’ is the story of a young painter Aniket Chatterjee, who commits suicide by taking sleeping pills. This movie is about what the character thinks and realises as he steadily approaches death while standing at the line between life and death. It is a journey from one's consciousness to sub consciousness, and occasionally the line between the two gets hazy.

Reception
IMDb rated 7.4 out of 10. The film magazine Cult Critic rated this film 8.3 out of 10.

Awards and recognition
Dasein has screened at several international film festivals and won multiple awards in a range of categories.
The film was shown at the Miami Independent Film Festival in 2015
In 2016, the film was accepted in Blowup Film Festival
Dasein was featured in Los Angeles Cine Fest in 2015.
Best picture featured award Hollywood International Moving Pictures Film Festival

References

External links 
 

2015 films
Indian drama films
Bengali-language Indian films